The 1960 United States Senate election in Rhode Island took place on November 8, 1960. Incumbent Democratic U.S. Senator Theodore F. Green did not seek re-election. Democrat Claiborne Pell won the seat, defeating Republican Raoul Archambault Jr.

Primary elections 
The Republican primary was held on September 19, 1960, and the Democratic primary was held on September 28, 1960.

Democratic primary

Candidates 
Claiborne Pell, vice president of the International Rescue Committee, vice president of North American Newspaper Alliance
Dennis J. Roberts, former Governor of Rhode Island
J. Howard McGrath, former U.S. Senator, former U.S. Attorney General

Results

Republican primary

Candidates 
Raoul Archambault Jr., Republican nominee for Governor in 1952

Results

General election

Results

References

Bibliography

External links

Rhode Island
1960
1960 Rhode Island elections